The 2014 German Open Grand Prix Gold was the second grand prix gold and grand prix tournament of the 2014 BWF Grand Prix Gold and Grand Prix. The tournament was held in RWE-Sporthalle, Mulheim an der Ruhr, Germany from February 25 until March 2, 2014 and had a total purse of $120,000.

Players by nation

Men's singles

Seeds

  Tommy Sugiarto (withdrew)
  Boonsak Ponsana (second round)
  Hu Yun (second round)
  Marc Zwiebler (semi-final)
  Tanongsak Saensomboonsuk (first round)
  Son Wan-ho (quarter-final)
  Kento Momota (third round)
  Takuma Ueda (third round)
  Kashyap Parupalli (second round)
  Dionysius Hayom Rumbaka (first round)
  Rajiv Ouseph (second round)
  Hans-Kristian Vittinghus (final)
  Sho Sasaki (quarter-final)
  Viktor Axelsen (quarter-final)
  Chou Tien-chen (semi-final)
  Hsu Jen-hao (quarter-final)

Finals

Top half

Section 1

Section 2

Section 3

Section 4

Bottom half

Section 5

Section 6

Section 7

Section 8

Women's singles

Seeds

  Sung Ji-hyun (final)
  Bae Yeon-ju (quarter-final)
  Tai Tzu-ying (first round)
  Porntip Buranaprasertsuk (first round)
  Nichaon Jindapon (semi-final)
  Sayaka Takahashi (champion)
  Eriko Hirose (quarter-final)
  Carolina Marín (semi-final)

Finals

Top half

Section 1

Section 2

Bottom half

Section 3

Section 4

Men's doubles

Seeds

  Hiroyuki Endo / Kenichi Hayakawa (final)
  Hoon Thien How / Tan Wee Kiong (semi-final)
  Angga Pratama / Ryan Agung Saputro (withdrew)
  Lee Sheng-mu / Tsai Chia-hsin (quarter-final)
  Chris Adcock / Andrew Ellis (first round)
  Maneepong Jongjit / Nipitphon Puangpuapech (semi-final)
  Goh V Shem / Lim Khim Wah (quarter-final)
  Takeshi Kamura / Keigo Sonoda (champion)

Finals

Top half

Section 1

Section 2

Bottom half

Section 3

Section 4

Women's doubles

Seeds

  Misaki Matsutomo / Ayaka Takahashi (champion)
  Jung Kyung-eun / Kim Ha-na (final)
  Jang Ye-na / Kim So-young (quarter-final)
  Reika Kakiiwa / Miyuki Maeda (semi-final)
  Duanganong Aroonkesorn / Kunchala Voravichitchaikul (second round)
  Vivian Hoo Kah Mun / Woon Khe Wei (quarter-final)
  Lee So-hee / Shin Seung-chan (quarter-final)
  Eefje Muskens / Selena Piek (semi-final)

Finals

Top half

Section 1

Section 2

Bottom half

Section 3

Section 4

Mixed doubles

Seeds

  Chris Adcock / Gabrielle Adcock (second round)
  Sudket Prapakamol / Saralee Thoungthongkam (first round)
  Ko Sung-hyun / Kim Ha-na (final)
  Michael Fuchs / Birgit Michels (quarter-final)
  Lee Chun Hei / Chau Hoi Wah (quarter-final)
  Chris Langridge / Heather Olver (first round)
  Anders Kristiansen / Julie Houmann (second round)
  Kenichi Hayakawa / Misaki Matsutomo (second round)

Finals

Top half

Section 1

Section 2

Bottom half

Section 3

Section 4

References

German Open (badminton)
German Open
Open
Sport in Mülheim
BWF Grand Prix Gold and Grand Prix